The PHILIPS 1999 China FA Cup (Chinese: 1999飞利浦中国足球协会杯) was the 5th edition of Chinese FA Cup after professional football league was established in China. The cup title sponsor was Philips.

Results

First round

First leg

Second leg

Second round

First leg

Second leg

Third round

First leg

Second leg

Semi-finals

First leg

Second leg

Finals

First leg

Second leg

Notes

References

1999
1999 in Chinese football
1999 domestic association football cups